G-Mobile Arena is an association football stadium in Ulaanbaatar, Mongolia. It is the home of Ulaanbaatar City FC of the Mongolian Premier League. Naming rights belong to Mongolian wireless communication company G-Mobile. The arena includes stands on all four sides and a half roof. An artificial turf surface was imported from the Netherlands. The president of Ulaanbaatar City FC described the stadium as "European quality."

History
Ground was broken for the 3,000-seat stadium in summer 2017 with the anticipated opening to take place in 2019. The stadium will be the fourth stadium in the Mongolian Premier League along with the MFF Football Centre, Erdenet Stadium, and Erchim Stadium. As of the Ulaanbaatar City FC became only the third Mongolian club, following Erchim FC and Khangarid FC, to have its own stadium.

References

Football venues in Mongolia
Buildings and structures in Ulaanbaatar
2018 establishments in Mongolia